Grant M. Simmons (born March 7, 1943) is an American former professional basketball player.

Early life
Benson attended Benson High School in Omaha, Nebraska, where he was named to the Omaha World-Herald All-Intercity team in both basketball and football as a senior.

College career
After ininitally attending Tulsa, he switched after two weeks to the University of Nebraska in September 1962. where he played college basketball for the Nebraska Cornhuskers. As a senior in 1965–66 he was named to the Big Eight Conference's First Team.

Professional career
Simmons was drafted by the Baltimore Bullets in the 12th round of the 1966 NBA draft but turned down their contract offer to work towards his Master's Degree at Nebraska while also joining the coaching staff at Lincoln High School. He later played in the American Basketball Association for the Denver Nuggets during the 1967–68 and 1968–69 seasons.

References

External links
 Grant Simmons – Nebraska High School Hall of Fame Foundation
 College statistics at Sports Reference

1943 births
Living people
American men's basketball players
Baltimore Bullets (1963–1973) draft picks
Basketball players from Nebraska
Basketball players from New Orleans
Denver Rockets players
Nebraska Cornhuskers men's basketball players
Point guards
Sportspeople from Omaha, Nebraska

it:Grant Simmons